Feodora Schenk (5 April 1920 – 23 March 2006) was an Austrian athlete. She competed in the women's high jump at the 1952 Summer Olympics.

References

1920 births
2006 deaths
Athletes (track and field) at the 1952 Summer Olympics
Austrian female high jumpers
Olympic athletes of Austria
People from Teltow-Fläming
House of Solms-Baruth